Auguste Vallet de Viriville, after 1858 known as Auguste Vallet (23 April 1815, in Paris – 20 February 1868, in Paris) was a French archivist and historian.

He received his education at the École des Chartes in Paris, obtaining his degree as an archivist-paleographer in 1837. Afterwards, he worked as an archivist for the département of Aube, and in 1847 attained a professorship at the École des Chartes.

He served as vice-president of the Société de l'École des chartes, and was a resident member of the Société nationale des antiquaires de France (1855–68).

Selected works 
 Les archives historiques du département de l'Aube, 1841 – Historical archives of Aube.
 Essai sur les archives historiques du chapitre de l'Eglise Cathédrale de Notre-Dame à St-Omer (Pas-de-Calais), 1844 – Essay on the historical archives of the chapter of the Cathedral Church of Our Lady in St-Omer (Pas-de-Calais). 
 Histoire de l'instruction publique en Europe et principalement en France, 1849 – History of public education in Europe, mainly France.
 Des ouvrages alchimiques attribués à Nicolas Flamel, 1856 – Alchemical works attributed to Nicolas Flamel.
 Chronique de Charles VII; (as editor; 3 volumes, 1858) – Chronicles of Charles VII.
 Chronique de la Pucelle, ou Chronique de Cousinot; (as editor, 1859) – Chronique de la Pucelle, or chronicles of Guillaume Cousinot de Montreuil. 
 Histoire de Charles VII, roi de France, et de son epoque, 1403-1461 (3 volumes, 1863–65) – History of Charles VII of France, and his era, 1403–1461.
 Procès de condamnation de Jeanne d'arc dite la Pucelle d'Orléans, 1867 – Process of condemnation of Joan of Arc, known as the Maid of Orléans.

References 

1815 births
1868 deaths
Writers from Paris
École Nationale des Chartes alumni
Academic staff of the École Nationale des Chartes
19th-century French historians
French archivists